Andole–Jogipet is a town and revenue division, municipality in Sangareddy district of Telangana, India. It is a conurbation of two towns, Andole and Jogipet. It was formed as a Nagar panchayat in 2013, and was upgraded to municipality in 2018. and became Revenue Division in 2020

History 
The first conference of Andhra Mahasabha was held in 1930 at Jogipet under the chairmanship of Suravaram Pratapareddy.

Demographics 

Government and politics 
The town falls under Andole (SC) constituency of Telangana Legislative Assembly. Chanti Kranti Kiran from Telangana Rashtra Samithi was elected as its MLA in 2018. Previously Damodar Raja Narasimha, former deputy chief minister of Andhra Pradesh state and Babu Mohan are elected from this constituency.

Andole–Jogipet revenue division was created in July 2020.

In popular culture 
Jogipet was featured in the Telugu film Jathi Ratnalu. The film was shot in the town and the main trio in this film belong to Jogipet where  Naveen Polishetty played the role of Jogipet Srikanth.
Srikanth is said to have been the B.Tech. topper of Jogipet.

References 

Cities and towns in Sangareddy district